William Orville Moore (February 17, 1841 – October 3, 1913) was an American Democratic politician who served as a member of the Virginia House of Delegates, representing his native Wythe County for one session until his death in 1913.

Moore enlisted in the Confederate Army in 1861 and was commissioned as a lieutenant in the 22nd Virginia Cavalry. He served until the end of the war, being promoted up to colonel just before the fall of Richmond.

References

External links

1841 births
1913 deaths
Democratic Party members of the Virginia House of Delegates
19th-century American politicians